Euptilon is a genus of antlions in the family Myrmeleontidae. There are about five described species in Euptilon.

Species
These five species belong to the genus Euptilon:
 Euptilon arizonense (Banks, 1935)
 Euptilon decipiens (Banks, 1935)
 Euptilon normale (Banks, 1942)
 Euptilon ornatum (Drury, 1773)
 Euptilon sinuatum (Currie, 1903)

References

Further reading

External links

 

Myrmeleontidae
Articles created by Qbugbot
Myrmeleontidae genera